The Raigad District Central Co-operative Bank was established on 30 September 1960. The Reserve Bank of India granted a banking license to the bank on 11 November 1995. Jayant Prabhakar Patil (MLC) took charge of the bank as chairman in 1997. It is the first District Cooperative Central Bank to issue Kisan Credit Card in India which was launched on 18 May 2013.

References

External links

1960 establishments in Maharashtra
Cooperative banks of India
Raigad district
Banks based in Maharashtra
Indian companies established in 1960
Banks established in 1960